Charulatha is an Indian actress. She has acted mainly in Kannada films along with Tamil, Telugu, Odia and Malayalam films.

Biography
Born as Sonia Singh Walia in Punjab, and brought up in Kerala. She started as a model, then acted in advertisements as a child in Kerala. She first featured as a lead actress in the Kannda film O Mallige directed by V. Manohar gave screen name Charulatha.

Filmography

References

External links 
 

20th-century Indian actresses
21st-century Indian actresses
Actresses from Punjab, India
Actresses in Kannada cinema
Actresses in Malayalam cinema
Actresses in Tamil cinema
Indian film actresses
Year of birth missing (living people)
Living people
Actresses in Telugu cinema